The 1987 Cork Senior Football Championship was the 99th staging of the Cork Senior Football Championship since its establishment by the Cork County Board in 1887. The draw for the opening round fixtures took place on 26 January 1986. The championship began on 13 April 1986 and ended on 28 September 1986.

St. Finbarr's entered the championship as the defending champions.

On 28 September 1986, Imokilly won the championship following a 2-04 to 0-09 defeat of St. Finbarr's in the final. This was their second championship title overall and their first title since 1984.

Bishopstown's Paul McGrath was the championship's top scorer with 0-24.

Team changes

To Championship

Promoted from the Cork Intermediate Football Championship
 O'Donovan Rossa

From Championship

Regraded to the Cork Intermediate Football Championship
 Naomh Abán

Results

First round

Second round

Quarter-finals

Semi-finals

Final

Championship statistics

Top scorers

Top scorers overall

Top scorers in a single game

Miscellaneous
 O'Donovan Rossa return to the senior championship. 
 Castlehaven were thrown out of the championship by a vote of 56 to 2 after walking off the field in their second round second replay with University College Cork.

References

Cork Senior Football Championship
1986 in Gaelic football